Dixon is an unincorporated community located in Rio Arriba County, New Mexico, United States, on New Mexico State Road 75, just east of New Mexico State Road 68, in the north-central part of the state, and is approximately  southwest of Taos. It is on the banks of the Embudo Creek, a tributary of the Rio Grande. The town is home to the largest population of organic farmers in the state, as well as several wineries.

According to the 2010 Census the population is 926, with 70% of residents identifying as Hispanic. Many non-Hispanics have made their homes here since the mid-1960s.

Demographics

History
The area was inhabited by Tiwa peoples from nearby Picuris Pueblo, then settled by Spanish colonists under the 1725 Embudo Land Grant. The original name was El Puerto del Embudo de Nuestro Señor San Antonio and the grant was made in 1725, to Francisco Martín, Lázaro Córdova and Juan Márquez. The acequias (irrigation canals) were the first public works project of any land grant, so they were started immediately after settlement, on September 20, 1725, and there are 10 Historic Acequias with senior water rights on the Embudo River and one with junior water rights. On the Rio Grande there are two with senior rights and two with junior water rights. The aldea was known as San Antonio del Embudo until around 1900 when a post office was established and the name was changed to Dixon, reputedly to honor Collins Dixon, a school teacher who taught here in the late 19th century; one tradition has him being a Civil War army deserter; his descendants live around nearby Española.

Climate and wineries
Because of the temperate climate generated by the local topography and helped by the acequias (irrigation ditch system), the Embudo Valley has become a significant fruit and grape growing area and the greater Dixon area has two wineries, the La Chiripada Winery and the Vivác Winery.

Art and the Dixon Studio Tour
The substantial number of artists and craft people living in the area led to the 1982 creation of the Dixon Studio Tour which annually draws many visitors during the two days in November that it occupies. There are several galleries in the area, including: Rift Gallery, Rare Earth Gallery, Alluvial, and Metier Fine Handweaving and Craft. Annual summer stonecarving workshops are held at Southwest Stoneworks adjacent to Rift Gallery.

Points of interest
Maps and release forms to visit the mine can be obtained at the University of New Mexico, Department of Earth and Planetary Sciences, or at the Dixon home of Gilbert Griego, mine caretaker, or at the Embudo Valley Library in Dixon.

Community
Dixon is home to the community supported Embudo Valley Library, radio station KLDK-LP and the Dixon Cooperative Market, and during the summer months the Dixon Farmers' Market. It also has a retreat center, at Mission Embudo, which offers space for workshops and retreats.

Education
It is in Española Public Schools. Dixon has one elementary school, Dixon Elementary. The comprehensive public high school is Española Valley High School.

Notable people 
 Al Hurricane, musician often referred to as "The Godfather" of New Mexico music
 Levi Romero, poet, architect, and professor at the University of New Mexico

See also

References

External links

  Dixon Studio Tour, an annual event

Census-designated places in Rio Arriba County, New Mexico
Census-designated places in New Mexico